The 12th AVN Awards ceremony, organized by Adult Video News (AVN) took place on January 7, 1995, at Bally's Hotel and Casino, Paradise, Nevada beginning at 7:45 p.m. PST / 10:45 p.m. EST. During the ceremony, AVN presented AVN Awards (commonly referred to as the Oscars of porn) in 89 categories honoring the movies released during the period December 1, 1993 to November 30, 1994. The ceremony was produced by Gary Miller, Mark Stone and Marco Polo. Actor Steven St. Croix hosted the show for the first time, with co-hosts Dyanna Lauren and Tera Heart.

Michael Ninn's Sex won nine awards, including Best Film. Other winners included Dog Walker and Shame with five each. Flashpoint and Idol Country were the top gay movies with four trophies apiece.

Winners and nominees 

The nominees for the 12th AVN Awards were announced at the AVN nominations luncheon 30 days prior to the awards ceremony. Dog Walker and Michael Ninn's Sex earned the most nominations with fourteen. They were the most nominated movies since the awards began in 1984. Shame, an avant-garde western, earned ten nominations while Body & Soul and The Dinner Party had nine apiece.

The winners were announced during the awards ceremony on January 7, 1995. John Leslie won best director in both the film and the video categories, the first time that had happened. He joined previous winners Cecil Howard and Henri Pachard as the only people to have won three best director awards. Ashlyn Gere won Best Actress in both the film and the video categories, just as she had done two years earlier. Asia Carrera became the first person to win the AVN Award for Female Performer of the Year in her first year in the industry. Kylie Ireland was crowned Starlet of the Year.

Major awards 

Winners are listed first, highlighted in boldface, and indicated with a double dagger.

Additional award winners 

These awards were also announced at the awards show, in two winners-only segments read by T. T. Boy, Dyanna Lauren and Tera Heart. Some of the gay awards were announced by Gender and Chris Green.

 Best All-Girl Feature: Creme de Femme
 Best All-Girl Sex Scene, FIlm: Celeste, Debi Diamond, Misty Rain; The Dinner Party
 Best Alternative Adult Video/Film Featurette: Sex On The Strip
 Best Alternative Feature Film: Killer Looks
 Best Alternative Specialty Tape: Labor Day Wet T&A 1994
 Best Amateur Series: Video Virgins
 Best Amateur Tape: Homegrown Video 432
 Best Anal Sex Scene: Sara, Jessica, Felipe, Rocco Siffredi; Bend Over Brazilian Babes 2
 Best Anal-Themed Feature: Butt-Banged Bicycle Babes
 Best Art Direction—Film: Sex
 Best Art Direction—Video: Shame
 Best Box Cover Concept: Film Buff
 Best Cinematography: Jack Remy, Dog Walker
 Best Compilation Tape: Sodo-Mania: The Baddest Of The Bad
 Best Editing—Film: B. Dennis Wood, Sex
 Best Editing—Video: Phillip Christian, Shame
 Best Ethnic-Themed Video: My Baby Got Back 3
 Best Explicit Series: Infinity 2-Hour Series
 Best Foreign Release: Virgin Treasures 1 & 2
 Best Gang Bang Tape: Starbangers 6
 Best Gonzo Video: Dick & Jane Do Northridge
 Best Group Sex Scene, Film: Gerry Pike, Debi Diamond, Diva, Misty Rain; Sex
 Best Music: Dino Ninn, Sex
 Best Non-Sexual Performance: E. Z. Ryder, Erotika
 Best Original CD-ROM: Nightwatch II
 Best Overall Marketing Campaign: John Wayne Bobbitt: Uncut
 Best Packaging—Film: Sex
 Best Packaging—Video: Blondage
 Best Packaging—Specialty: The Domination of Summer 2
 Best Pro-Am/Gonzo Series: Radical Affairs
 Best Pro-Am Tape: Up 'n' Cummers 7

 Best Screenplay, Film: John Leslie, Dog Walker
 Best Screenplay, Video: Mitchell Spinelli, The Face
 Best Special Effects: Virtual Sex
 Best Specialty Tape—Big Bust: Double D Housewives
 Best Specialty Tape—Bondage: Strictly For Pleasure
 Best Specialty Tape—Other Genre: The Lovers' Guide: Better Orgasms
 Best Specialty Tape—Spanking: Painful Cheeks—Shades of Red
 Best Tease Performance: Christina Angel, Dog Walker
 Best Trailer: Sex
 Best Videography: Phillip Christian Shame

GAY AWARDS:
 Best Bisexual Video: Revenge of the Bi Dolls
 Best Box Cover Concept—Gay Video: Slave Auction
 Best Director—Bisexual Video: Josh Eliot, Revenge of the Bi Dolls
 Best Director—Gay Video: John Rutherford, Flashpoint
 Best Editing—Gay Video: Tab Lloyd, Boot Black
 Best Gay Alternative Video Release: A Gay Man's Guide to Safe Sex
 Best Gay Solo Video: Jeff Stryker, The Tease; Rob Lee's Private Moments (tie)
 Best Gay Specialty Release: The New Pledgemaster
 Best Gay Video: Flashpoint
 Best Music—Gay Video: Sharon Kane, Chris Green; Revenge of the Bi Dolls
 Best Newcomer—Gay Video: Steven Marks
 Best Non-Sexual Role—Gay Video: Sharon Kane, Conflict of Interest
 Best Packaging—Gay Video: Idol Country
 Best Performance in a Gay Video: Ryan Idol, Idol Country
 Best Sex Scene—Gay Video: Trent Reed, Bryce Colby; the cone scene, Flashpoint
 Best Screenplay—Gay Video: Gender, Idol Country
 Best Supporting Performer—Gay Video: Scott Baldwin, Flashpoint
 Best Transsexual Video: Beverly She-Billies
 Best Videography—Gay Video: Kathy Mack, Bruce Cam; Idol Country
 Gay Performer of the Year: Joey Stefano

Honorary AVN Awards

Special Achievement Award 
 Mark Carriere of Leisure Time Entertainment
 John Stagliano of Evil Angel Productions

Hall of Fame 

AVN Hall of Fame inductees for 1995 were: Robert Bullock, Karen Dior, Chi Chi LaRue, Scotty Fox, Ryan Idol, Sean Michaels, Kelly Nichols, Nikki Randall, Jim South, Sheri St. Clair, Samantha Strong

Multiple nominations and awards 

The following five movies received the most nominations:

The following ten movies received multiple awards:

Presenters and performers 

The following individuals, in order of appearance, presented awards or performed musical numbers or magical acts. The show's trophy girls were Lexus Locklear and Lisa Ann.

Presenters

Performers

Ceremony information 

Actor Steven St. Croix hosted the show for the first time following a three-year stint by actor Randy West. His co-host for the first half of the show was Dyanna Lauren while Tera Heart co-hosted the last half of the show.

Midway through the show, AVN executive editor Gene Ross introduced a montage of scenes of humorous moments from a variety of movies, "Great Moments in Adult Video History", featuring actor Randy West and dozens of others.

Several other people were involved with the production of the ceremony. Gary Miller and Mark Stone served as producer and director for the show while Marco Polo served as director of the broadcast. Stone also served as musical director.

There were several new categories for this year's awards show, including: Best Ethnic-Themed Video, Best Special Effects, the Hot Vidéo Award (Best European Release), Most Outrageous Sex Scene and a couple more awards in gay categories.

John Wayne Bobbitt: Uncut was announced as the movie with the most sales and also the most rentals over the 12 months.

A VHS videotape of the show was also published and sold by VCA Pictures, which had hardcore clips of the winning movies interspersed with the awards presentations. A softcore version was made available on VHS for promotional purposes by NightVision.

Critical reception 

The show received a mixed reception from media publications. Erotic X-Film Guide called the show "a gala, star-studded event equal in glitz and glamor to any mainstream film awards show". However, Oui magazine and Adult Cinema Review said the video montage didn't work and some of the other entertainment was long, boring and tedious.

In Memoriam 

AVN publisher Paul Fishbein shared a moment of remembrance for industry performers who died over the past 12 months:

 Jack Baker
 Moana Pozzi
 Michel Ricaud
 Savannah
 Joey Stefano

See also

 AVN Award for Best Actress
 AVN Award for Best Supporting Actress
 AVN Award for Male Performer of the Year
 AVN Award for Male Foreign Performer of the Year
 AVN Award for Female Foreign Performer of the Year
 AVN Female Performer of the Year Award
 List of members of the AVN Hall of Fame

Notes

 The wrong winner was announced at the show. Adult Video News magazine corrected the mistake: "A program misprint and the fact that Tammi Ann's name was inadvertently dropped, might have caused some confusion in this category. Buttslammers 3 was announced from the program dais, however Buttslammers 4 is the official winner."

References

Bibliography

External links

 
 Adult Video News Awards  at the Internet Movie Database
 
 
 

AVN Awards
1994 film awards
AVN Awards 12
1995 in Nevada